The Whispers is the ninth studio album by American R&B/soul vocal group The Whispers, released on October 20, 1979 by SOLAR Records. It was the first hit album for the veteran group, peaking at number one on the Billboard Top Soul LPs chart, as well as number six on the Billboard Top LPs chart.

The album launched four singles, including their breakthrough single, the Leon Sylvers III-produced post-disco number, "And the Beat Goes On", which became their biggest hit single to date, reaching number one on the Hot Soul Singles chart, and crossing over to number 19 on the Billboard Hot 100, as well as landing in the top ten on various international charts. Other hit singles included "A Song for Donny", a tribute song to American musician Donny Hathaway, who died in January 1979. The song reached number 21 on the Hot Soul Singles chart. The Nicholas Caldwell-composed "Lady" became another hit, peaking at number three on the Hot Soul Singles chart, while also crossing over to the Hot 100 and adult contemporary charts and the UK charts, in 1980. A cover of The Temptations' "My Girl", became a hit in the UK, reaching number twenty six, while a fifth single, "Out the Box", was promoted briefly.

The album eventually went double-platinum becoming the Watts-based group's biggest success and their breakthrough after more than 15 years together.

Track listing
"A Song for Donny" - (Donny Hathaway, special lyrics by Carrie Lucas) - 4:27 	
"My Girl" - (Smokey Robinson, Ronald White) - 5:53 	
"Lady" - (Nicholas Caldwell) - 5:05 	
"Can You Do the Boogie" - (Carrie Lucas, Norman Beavers) - 6:07 	
"And The Beat Goes On" - (William B. Shelby, Stephen Shockley, Leon Sylvers III) - 7:30 ^
"I Love You" - (Kossi Gardner) - 5:10 	
"Out the Box" - (William B. Shelby, Leon Sylvers III) - 4:57 	
"Welcome into My Dream" - (Grady Wilkins) - 4:40

^ Certain remastered versions of the album replace the full seven-and-a-half minute version of "And the Beat Goes On" with the edited version (length of 4:56) and include the full version as one of several bonus tracks.

Personnel
Bass – Craig "Mr. Bass" Raglin, Leon Sylvers III, Melvin Coleman
Drums – Kirk Perkins, Wardell Potts, William "Buba" Bryant
Guitar – Larry White, Stephen Shockley, Werner Schuchner (Bear)
Keyboards – Barry Sarna, Grady Wilkins, Kevin Spencer, Kossi Gardner, Norman Beavers, Ricky Smith, William Shelby
Percussion – Bobbye Hall, Fred "Timbales" Lewis, Karl E. Dickens
Vocals – Leaveil Degree, Marcus Hutson, Nicholas Caldwell, Wallace Scott, Walter Scott

Charts

Singles

See also
List of number-one R&B albums of 1980 (U.S.)

References

External links
 The Whispers-The Whispers at Discogs

1979 albums
SOLAR Records albums
The Whispers albums